Maxey Castle was a medieval fortified manor house castle in Maxey, Cambridgeshire, England.

Details

Maxey Castle was built around the 1370s by William Thorpe near the village of Maxey. The castle had a double-moat, possibly designed as a flood defence, with a central keep within a bailey wall with corner towers.
Margaret Beaufort, Countess of Richmond and of Derby,  and mother of king Henry VII lived here in the fifteenth century.

Today only the partial remains of the moats survive of the castle, which have scheduled monument status.

See also
Castles in Great Britain and Ireland
List of castles in England

References

Castles in Cambridgeshire